"Foster and Catchings" refers to two American economists of the 1920s, William Trufant Foster and Waddill Catchings, who worked extensively together and hence are often referred to as a pair.

Writing duos